The Bureau of Insular Affairs was a division of the United States Department of War that oversaw civil aspects of the administration of several territories from 1898 until 1939.

History

The bureau was created 13 December 1898 as the Division of Customs and Insular Affairs within the Office of the Secretary of War. This followed the Spanish–American War, which resulted in the transfer of several areas from Spain to the United States, including the Philippines, Puerto Rico, and Cuba. The bureau supervised the customs and civil affairs of these areas. The word "insular" was already associated with Cuba and Puerto Rico because the Spanish had created autonomous "insular" governments for both islands in February 1898.

In 1900, the name was changed to Division of Insular Affairs, and in 1902 it became the Bureau of Insular Affairs. As a result of the Insular Cases, the U.S. Attorney General issued an opinion in 1915 stating that the insular areas were unincorporated territories of the United States. In 1939, the bureau was replaced by the Division of Territories and Island Possessions in the Department of the Interior. This division was later renamed the Office of Insular Affairs.

Puerto Rico
From 1898 to 1900 and again in 1909–1934, the Bureau was responsible for the administration of Puerto Rico, called "Porto Rico" in official U.S. government documents until 1932. Puerto Rico, also an unincorporated territory of the United States, was administered under a civil government created by the Foraker Act of 1900, amended by the Jones–Shafroth Act of 1917. In 1934, the Bureau's functions for Puerto Rico were transferred to the Division of Territories and Island Possessions (later the Office of Territories and still later the Office of Territorial Affairs) within the Department of the Interior.

Cuba
The bureau's other responsibilities included oversight of Cuba, although those responsibilities were not clearly defined. From 1906–1909, it administered the sovereign Republic of Cuba during the Second Occupation of Cuba. In 1904–1905, it briefly had oversight of the Panama Canal. In 1905–1939, it administered the Dominican customs receivership, and in 1920–1924 it administered the Haitian customs receivership. However, the bureau was never responsible for Hawaii, which was administered pursuant to an Organic Act giving it the status of an incorporated territory, or for American Samoa, Guam, or the United States Virgin Islands, all of which were administered during these years by the United States Navy Department.

Philippines
The bureau was responsible for civil aspects of the Philippine government from 1898 to 1935. The United States Military Government of the Philippine Islands was replaced by the Insular Government following the Spooner Amendment of 1901.

Befitting its organization within the War Department, the chief of the bureau was always an army general. The longest-tenured chiefs were Brig. Gen. Clarence R. Edwards, who served from 1902 to 1912, and Maj. Gen. Frank McIntyre, who served from 1912 to 1929. Future Supreme Court justice Felix Frankfurter served briefly as a law officer for the bureau beginning in 1911.

References

Further reading
 National Archives & Records Service, Inventory No. 3: Records of the Bureau of Insular Affairs (Record Group 350) (1971).
 Pomery, Earl S., "The American Colonial Office," Mississippi Valley Historical Review, vol. 30, no. 4, pp. 521–532 (March 1944).
 Pratt, Julius W., America's Colonial Experiment (New York 1950).

United States Department of War
Government agencies established in 1898